Vítor Machado Ferreira (born 13 February 2000), known as Vitinha, is a Portuguese professional footballer who plays as a midfielder for Ligue 1 club Paris Saint-Germain and the Portugal national team.

Coming through Porto's youth system, Vitinha impressed during his time with the reserve team before being promoted to the first-team in 2020, winning a domestic double of the Primeira Liga and the Taça de Portugal in his first season. He was loaned to Premier League club Wolverhampton Wanderers in September 2020, before returning the following season. He established himself as an integral player for Porto winning a second domestic double, being named in the Primeira Liga Team of the Year and winning the Best Young Player of the Year award. In June 2022, he joined Paris Saint-Germain for a transfer worth €41.5 million.

Vitinha is a former Portugal youth international, representing his country at various youth levels, being part of the under-19 and under-21 teams that finished as runners-up in the 2019 UEFA European Under-19 Championship and 2021 European Under-21 Championship, respectively. He made his senior international debut in 2022, representing Portugal at the 2022 FIFA World Cup.

Club career

Porto

2019–20: Early career
Vitinha was born in Santo Tirso. He started playing football at Desportivo das Aves, where his father formerly played for the club, aged 7, before moving to Pinheirinhos de Ringe, where he started to stand out alongside goalkeeper and future teammate Diogo Costa. After going through some training sessions with Benfica, he was integrated into one of Benfica's feeder club Póvoa de Lanhoso, where he stayed for three years, before being dismissed because of his slight frame. Despite Sporting CP being interested in him, Vitinha ended up joining the youth ranks of FC Porto two years later, aged eleven, being subsequently loaned to Padroense for a season.

He made his LigaPro debut for the reserve team on 11 August 2019 in a game against Sporting da Covilhã. He was also part of Porto's squad that won the 2018–19 UEFA Youth League. On 28 January 2020, Vitinha made his first appearance for the first team, coming on as a substitute for Wilson Manafá in the 61st minute in a match against Gil Vicente. He made a total of eight appearances as the club won the league title.

2020–21: Loan to Wolves
On 9 September 2020, Vitinha moved on a season-long loan to English Premier League club Wolverhampton Wanderers. The club held an option to make the loan into permanent deal at its conclusion for a fee of €20 million, as Porto were forced to loan him due to UEFA's Financial Fair Play regulations. He made his debut on 14 September away to Sheffield United as a second-half substitute, and his first start three days later in a home EFL Cup defeat to Stoke City.

Vitinha made his full Premier League debut away to Manchester United on 29 December 2020, a game which Wolves lost narrowly to a  deflection in added time. On 22 January, he scored his first goal for the club with a 35-yard strike in a 1–0 away win over non-League team Chorley in the fourth round of the FA Cup. At the end of the season, the club declined to exercise his buy option.

2021–22: Return and domestic double
Vitinha began the 2021–22 season on the bench, but following his impressive performances during the 2021 UEFA European Under-21 Championship, he began finding more and more space as a starter, scoring his first goal for the club in a 3–0 away win against Portimonense on 3 December. On 23 December, Vitinha impressed during the 3–0 home over rivals Benfica in O Clássico in the Taça de Portugal, scoring and assisting a goal, as he was named man of match. Shortly after Sérgio Oliveira departed to Roma in January 2022, Vitinha further consolidated his place as starter, impressing Porto's manager Sérgio Conceição, with his performances without the ball and his pressing, being named the league's Player of the Month and Midfielder of the Month for two consecutive months in December and January, a feat which he repeated in March.

He would contribute to 47 appearances, with a goal in the 3–1 defeat of Tondela in the domestic cup final, to help Porto win the domestic double of the Primeira Liga and the Taça de Portugal, while also being named in the Primeira Liga Team of the Year and the Primeira Liga Best Young Player of the Year.

Paris Saint-Germain

In 30 June 2022, Vitinha signed a five-year contract with Ligue 1 side Paris Saint-Germain (PSG), for a reported fee of €41.5 million, after triggering the release clause of his contract. He made his debut for the club on 31 July, starting in PSG's 4–0 victory over Nantes in the Trophée des Champions, registering a 100% passing rate, completing 43 out of his 43 passes, while also being booked in the match and winning his first trophy with the club. Afterwards, his performances throughout the season were highly lauded, and he received various praises on the central midfield combination of him and Marco Verratti and for his quick adaption into his new team, despite fierce competition from more experienced players like Carlos Soler, Renato Sanches and Fabián Ruiz.

International career

Youth
Having played at various youth levels for Portugal, Vitinha was named captain for the under-19 squad at the 2019 UEFA European Under-19 Championship in Armenia, playing all five matches, scoring twice and assisting once as the team finished runners-up to Spain.

Vitinha was named in the under-21 squad for the 2021 UEFA European Under-21 Championship. He was named for the team of the tournament as Portugal finished as runners-up after losing in the final 1–0 to Germany, on 6 June 2021.

Senior
On 21 March 2022, Vitinha received his first call-up to the senior squad for the 2022 World Cup qualification play-offs, as a replacement for the injured Rúben Neves. Eight days later at his club ground, he made his senior national team debut, replacing João Moutinho in added time  in a 2–0 victory over North Macedonia in the play-off final.

In October, he was named in Portugal's preliminary 55-man squad for the 2022 FIFA World Cup in Qatar, being included in the final 26-man squad for the tournament.

Style of play

Vitinha is a highly creative and technically gifted playmaker, with excellent dribbling skills and ball control, which allows him to operate effectively in a deep-seated playmaking role as a central midfielder, although he is also capable of playing in a more advanced role as an attacking midfielder. He is a central midfielder who enjoys taking the ball off the toe of his centre-back before distributing to a teammate near or far, but always with forward momentum in mind. His skill and quick control make it almost impossible for the opposition press to work when he is in possession. He is really good at progressing the ball and has the ability to get the ball into dangerous locations with his passes and is extremely quick with his feet and is good at evading players. He excels in counter-pressing, recovering and tackling. He is very quick-witted when it comes to creating counter-attacks right after winning the ball. Off the ball, he tries to prevent the opposition’s attacks, and when he is on the ball, he helps his side in retaining the ball as he has excellent on-the-ball composure. He is also very good at reading the game and intercepting the ball, when it comes to winning the ball back he knows when to strategically foul the opponent in order to slow down an attack.

Personal life
Vitinha's father is Vítor Manuel, a former professional footballer who played as a midfielder for several clubs including his hometown's Desportivo das Aves for several years and Faro's Farense from 1999 to 2001.

Vitinha and his wife Tatiana Torres have a daughter born in 2021, named Mafalda Ferreira.

Career statistics

Club

International

Honours
Porto Youth
UEFA Youth League: 2018–19

Porto
Primeira Liga: 2019–20, 2021–22
Taça de Portugal: 2019–20, 2021–22
Paris Saint-Germain

 Trophée des Champions: 2022

Portugal U19
UEFA European Under-19 Championship runner-up: 2019

Portugal U21
UEFA European Under-21 Championship runner-up: 2021

Individual
Primeira Liga Best Young Player of the Year: 2021–22
Primeira Liga Player of the Month: December 2021, January 2022
Primeira Liga Midfielder of the Month: December 2021, January 2022, March 2022
Primeira Liga Team of the Year: 2021–22
Toulon Tournament Breakthrough player: 2019
Toulon Tournament Best XI: 2019
UEFA European Under-21 Championship Team of the Tournament: 2021

References

External links

 
 

2000 births
Living people
People from Santo Tirso
Sportspeople from Porto District
Portuguese footballers
Association football midfielders
FC Porto B players
FC Porto players
Wolverhampton Wanderers F.C. players
Paris Saint-Germain F.C. players
Liga Portugal 2 players
Primeira Liga players
Premier League players
Ligue 1 players
Portuguese expatriate footballers
Expatriate footballers in England
Expatriate footballers in France
Portuguese expatriate sportspeople in England
Portuguese expatriate sportspeople in France
2022 FIFA World Cup players